Valérie Jean-Charles (born 27 January 1969 in Paris) is a French track and field athlete, who specialises in the 200 meters. Jean-Charles competed in the women's 200 m at the 1992 Summer Olympics.

References 

French female sprinters
Olympic athletes of France
Athletes from Paris
Living people
1969 births
Athletes (track and field) at the 1992 Summer Olympics
Mediterranean Games gold medalists for France
Mediterranean Games medalists in athletics
Athletes (track and field) at the 1991 Mediterranean Games
Athletes (track and field) at the 1993 Mediterranean Games
Olympic female sprinters
20th-century French women